Tweedbank is a railway station on the Borders Railway, which runs between  and Tweedbank. It is owned by Network Rail and managed by ScotRail.

History
The station was built by BAM Nuttall, and opened on 6 September 2015.

Facilities
The station design uses a central platform with a line on either side.

Services

As of the May 2021 timetable change, the station is served by an hourly service between Edinburgh Waverley and Tweedbank, with a half-hourly service operating at peak times (Monday to Saturday). Some peak time trains continue to Glenrothes with Thornton. All services are operated by ScotRail.

Rolling stock used: Class 158 Express Sprinter and Class 170 Turbostar

References

External links
 
 

Railway stations in the Scottish Borders
Railway stations opened by Network Rail
Railway stations in Great Britain opened in 2015
Railway stations served by ScotRail
Borders Railway
2015 establishments in Scotland